A tuber is a type of modified plant structure that is enlarged to store nutrients.

Tuber may also refer to:
 Tuber (fungus), a genus of fungi that includes truffles
 Tuber (band), a stoner rock band from Greece
 A form of tumor exhibited in tuberous sclerosis
 Tuber Hill in Canadian Cascade Arc
 Tuber (app) (Tuber浏览器), a discontinued browser app developed by Shanghai Fengxuan Information Technology